County of Cardwell may refer to:
 County of Cardwell, Queensland, Australia
 County of Cardwell (South Australia)